"Stuck on You" is a song from the American alternative rock band Failure. It was released as the lead single from their third album Fantastic Planet. It was their only song to chart at Billboard and reached #23 in the U.S. Alternative Charts and #31 at U.S. Mainstream Rock Charts.

American rock band Paramore covered the song on their The Summer Tic EP, with the title taken from the song lyrics, with "tick" being replaced by "tic".

Music video
A music video was released around 1997, which resembles the opening credits from the movie The Spy Who Loved Me of the James Bond franchise, airing a few times on MTV. It appeared later on their Golden compilation.

On April 8 2020, Ken Andrews on his YouTube channel took a call from director Phil Harder to discuss how the video was made, and released a new transfer of the video from the recently recovered film copy. It was upscaled to High Definition playback.

Track listing

"Stuck On You (Radio Edit)" – 3:53
"Stuck On You (Album Version)" – 4:29

Chart performance

References

1996 singles
Failure (band) songs
1996 songs
Slash Records singles